Nedeuța River may refer to:

 Nedeuța, a tributary of the Cheagu in Hunedoara County
 Nedeuța, a tributary of the Valea Boului in Hunedoara County